Will Pearsall (born 12 March 1995) is an Australian former professional rugby league footballer.

Background
Born in Young, New South Wales, Pearsall played his junior rugby league for The Entrance Tigers, before being signed by the Manly Warringah Sea Eagles.

Playing career

Early career
From 2012 to 2015, Pearsall played for the Manly Warringah Sea Eagles' NYC team. In 2015, he captained the side. In October 2015, he signed a 2-year contract with the Newcastle Knights starting in 2016.

2016
In round 6 of the 2016 NRL season, Pearsall made his NRL debut for the Knights against the Wests Tigers.

2017
After failing to play another NRL game for the Knights in 2017, Pearsall left the club after not being offered a new contract beyond 2017. He decided to leave the game in favour of full-time employment on the Central Coast.

References

External links
Newcastle Knights profile

1995 births
Living people
Australian rugby league players
Newcastle Knights players
Rugby league five-eighths
Rugby league halfbacks
Rugby league players from Young, New South Wales